Ana-Neda (Bulgarian and ; fl. 1323–1324) was the Empress consort of Bulgaria briefly in 1323–1324 as the spouse of "Despot of Vidin" Michael Shishman who was elected as Emperor of Bulgaria in 1323. She was the daughter of Serbian King Stefan Uroš II Milutin and Princess Elizabeth Arpad,  daughter of King Stephen V of Hungary and Elizabeth the Kumana daughter of Köten. From the marriage with Michael, they had three sons, one of whom was Ivan Stephen of Bulgaria, later briefly the Emperor of Bulgaria (1330–1331).

Life
She was the daughter of Serbian King Stefan Uroš II Milutin and Princess Ana Terter, daughter of George I of Bulgaria. Some believe that her mother was Elizabeth of Hungary.

From the marriage with Michael they had three sons:
Ivan Stephen of Bulgaria, emperor of Bulgaria in 1330-1331
Michael, despotes in Vidin for a brief period
Shishman, pretender to the Bulgarian throne

In 1324, Michael Shishman divorced Anna Neda in order to marry Theodora of Byzantium. Anna Neda and her children were sent out of Turnovo into the countryside. In 1330, Michael Shishman died and was succeeded by his firstborn son Ivan Stephen of Bulgaria.

She took monastic vows and received the name Jelena. She was buried in the Dečani monastery. She was consecrated in the Serbian Orthodox Church as Venerable (prepodobna) "St. Jelena of Dečani" (Света Јелена Дечанска), her feast day is on June 3 (May 21, Julian calendar).

Annotations

Name: Recent Bulgarian historians call her Ana-Neda (with a dash). It is likely that she was born Neda, and upon the marriage to Michael, becoming a queen, she received the titular name Ana. She has also been called Dominika (Доминика), because Neda comes from "недеља" (nedelja) in Serbian, which means "Sunday", i.e. "Dius Domini").

References

Further reading

14th-century Serbian royalty
Bulgarian consorts
Medieval Serbian princesses
Serbian saints of the Eastern Orthodox Church
People from Vidin
Tsardom of Vidin
Nemanjić dynasty
Shishman dynasty
Burials at Visoki Dečani
14th-century Bulgarian women
Eastern Orthodox royal saints
14th-century Serbian women